New Sarepta is a hamlet in central Alberta, Canada, within Leduc County.

New Sarepta dissolved from village status to become a hamlet on September 1, 2010. It originally incorporated as a village on January 1, 1960.

History

Name 
The ancient Phoenician city of Sarepta was located on the Mediterranean coast of today's Lebanon, approximately at the site of the modern village of Sarafand, between Sidon and Tyre.

Sarepta was also mentioned, as Zarephath, in the Old Testament (I Kings 17:9), as the home of Elijah during a drought and famine.

In the 18th century (1765-1773), Moravian Brethren from Germany established the village of Sarepta, Volgograd, Russia.  About a century after its founding, the larger German Lutheran Church in Russia began efforts to take Sarepta under its wing. Many of the Moravian Brethren objected, moving elsewhere in Russia, then choosing to emigrate to the Western Hemisphere, including Canada.

Some of these settlers, part of the Germans from Russia diaspora, established a new village in Canada's North-West Territories.  From various suggestions, approximately 60 people in the new community signed a document favouring the name Sarepta, honouring their previous village. The government of the North-West Territories designated the name Sarepta to this settlement on October 2, 1904.  When the new province of Alberta was split from the North-West Territories in 1905, the government added "New" to distinguish it from the existing place name in Ontario.  The Moravian Brethren also felt that it honored and distinguished their newer community from the earlier biblical and Russian villages.

Timeline 

1906 New Sarepta School District #1548 was established.
1912 Long Prairie Store located in New Sarepta area.
1915 Railroad service extended through New Sarepta.
1916 First post office opened.
1920 Moravian Church was established in area led by Rev. William Scheel.
1921 Grain elevator built.
1927 New Sarepta village school was organized.
1928 First hotel opened.
1944 Curling rink was built.
1949 Oil boom in Alberta.
1960 New Sarepta incorporated as a village.
1962 New Sarepta Rural Fire was incorporated.
1972 Agriculture building was built.
1984 Tire & Girdle Store was built.
2010 Government of Alberta dissolved the village into a hamlet within Leduc County on September 1, 2010.

Demographics 

Religious assemblies 
St. John's Lutheran Church
The House of Prayer (formerly New Sarepta Country Church)
Zion Evangelical Missionary Church

Education 
New Sarepta has one elementary school and one high school, both operated by Black Gold Regional Schools.

Recreation 
Winter
New Sarepta Minor Hockey Association
New Sarepta Skating Club [No Club 2006–present]
Girl Guides
senior floor curling

Summer
baseball
slowpitch
softball
running track
basketball courts
playgrounds
Bent Stik Golf Course
New Sarepta Minor Soccer Association

See also 
List of communities in Alberta
List of former urban municipalities in Alberta
List of hamlets in Alberta

References 

2010 disestablishments in Alberta
Designated places in Alberta
Former villages in Alberta
Hamlets in Alberta
Populated places disestablished in 2010
History of the America (North) Province of the Moravian Church
Leduc County